was a Japanese football player. He played for Japan national team.

Club career
Hatta was born in Osaka on September 10, 1903. He played for Osaka SC was founded by his alma mater high school graduates and many Japan national team players Yoshimatsu Oyama, Toshio Miyaji, Sakae Takahashi and Kiyonosuke Marutani were playing in those days.

National team career
In May 1925, Hatta was selected Japan national team for 1925 Far Eastern Championship Games in Manila. At this competition, on May 17, he debuted against Philippines. On May 20, he also played against Republic of China. But Japan lost in both matches (0-4, v Philippines and 0-2, v Republic of China). He played 2 games for Japan in 1925.

After retirement
After retirement, Hatta entered Tokyo Imperial University and studied law. He graduated from university in 1930 and he became a judge. He worked at Tokyo District Court and so on.

April 20, 1989, Hatta died of heart failure in Fujisawa at the age of 85.

National team statistics

References

External links
 
 Japan National Football Team Database

1903 births
1989 deaths
University of Tokyo alumni
Association football people from Osaka Prefecture
Japanese footballers
Japan international footballers
Japanese judges
Sportspeople from Osaka
Association football midfielders